Les Horaces (The Horatii) is an operatic tragédie lyrique by Antonio Salieri. The text was by Nicolas-François Guillard after Pierre Corneille's Horace.

The opera was commissioned by the Paris Opera after the success of Salieri's Les Danaïdes with the company.

Performance history

According to different sources, Les Horaces was first performed either at Fontainebleau on 2 November 1786, or at Versailles on 2 December 1786. According to Spire Pitou, however, both dates seem to be errors and "the correct date of the world première of Salieri's Les Horaces is 7 December 1786 at the Royal Academy of Music ...".  Whatever the case, it was not well received. The failure of the opera to some extent has been blamed on the lackluster performances of the original performers.

Roles

References

Sources

 Original libretto: Les Horaces, Tragédie-Lyrique, en trois actes, mêlée d'intermedes. Représentée devant Leurs Majestés à Fontainebleau, le 2 Novembre 1786, Paris, Ballard, 1786 (a copy online at Gallica - Bibliothèque Nationale de France)
 Pitou, Spire, The Paris Opéra. An Encyclopedia of Operas, Ballets, Composers, and Performers – Rococo and Romantic, 1715-1815, Greenwood Press, Westport/London, 1985
 Horaces, Les by John A Rice, in 'The New Grove Dictionary of Opera', ed. Stanley Sadie (London, 1992) 

Tragédies en musique
Operas by Antonio Salieri
Operas
1786 operas
Operas based on works by Pierre Corneille
Libretti by Nicolas-François Guillard